Mimi Sverdrup Lunden (13 June 1894 – 8 January 1955) was a Norwegian educator, non-fiction writer and  proponent for women's rights

Personal life
Lunden was born in Sulen, Sogn og Fjordane, a daughter of Lutheran theologian  Edvard Sverdrup and Agnes Vollan (1866–1952). She was the sister of oceanographer Harald Ulrik Sverdrup (1888–1957), United States General Leif Sverdrup (1898-1976) and Einar Sverdrup (1895–1942) CEO of  Store Norske Spitsbergen Kulkompani.

In 1918 she married Tallak Lunden (1886–1930), with whom she had two daughters. Her husband was director at Kongsberg Municipal Middle School prior to his death in 1930.

Career
When she was 12 years old, her family moved to Kristiania (now Oslo).
She graduated artium in 1912 and  began studying Philology at the University of Oslo where she graduated in 1918.
Lunden worked for a time as a teacher at Kongsberg Municipal Middle School. 
After her husband's death in 1930, she completed a course of study at the University of Oslo in 1931. She was employed as a lecturer at Vestheim School and later at Hegdehaugen School in Oslo.

While she still had young children and her husband was seriously ill, she was terminated as a "married teacher". This experience reinforced her lifelong commitment in women's rights. In 1936, she joined  the Norwegian Association for Women's Rights  (Norsk Kvinnesaksforening). From 1948 she chaired the Norwegian chapter of the Women's International Democratic Federation. 

Lunden was also an  author. In 1922 she was awarded a prize from the Nansen Foundation. She wrote a number of noted books. Additionally she published articles about issues which concerned her: women's rights, international peacekeeping, and educational issues. Her best-known book is De frigjorte hender from 1941. The book is a study of women's important and varied work in the pre-industrial society. The book also noted that in the industrial age, much of this work was taken over by  factories,  machines and  men.

Selected works
Kvinnen og maskinen. Kvinnearbeidet i støpeskjeen, 1946
Foreningsarbeide, en håndbok, 1948
Barnas århundre, 1948
Den lange arbeidsdagen, 1948

References

1894 births
1955 deaths
People from Solund
University of Oslo alumni
Norwegian educators
Norwegian feminists
Norwegian women's rights activists
Norwegian non-fiction writers
Norwegian women non-fiction writers
Norwegian Association for Women's Rights people
20th-century non-fiction writers